Zieria pilosa, commonly known as hairy zieria, is a plant in the citrus family Rutaceae and is endemic to coastal New South Wales. It is a shrub with hairy branches, leaves composed of three leaflets and usually only single white to pale pink flowers in the leaf axils.

Description
The upper surface of the leaflets is flat, dark green and more or less glabrous while the lower surface is a paler green and hairy. The flowers are white to pale pink and are usually arranged singly in leaf axils and are shorter than the leaves. The petals are covered with soft hairs. In common with other zierias, there are only four stamens. Flowering mainly occurs in spring and early summer.

Taxonomy and naming
Zieria pilosa was first formally described in 1811 by Edward Rudge and the description was published in Transactions of the Linnean Society of London. The specific epithet (pilosa) is a Latin word meaning "hairy".

Distribution and habitat
This zieria grows in forest and heath in coastal and near-coastal districts between Taree and Eden.

References

pilosa
Sapindales of Australia
Flora of New South Wales
Plants described in 1811